Totskoye is a rural locality (a selo) and the administrative center of Totsky District of Orenburg Oblast, Russia. Population: 

During World War I, it was the site of a prisoner-of-war camp that became notorious for a typhus epidemic in the winter of 1915-1916. More than 9,000 of 17,000 prisoners died.

During World War II, it was the site of a prisoner-of-war camp for Polish prisoners. In 1941–1942, it was one of places for the formation of the Polish Armed Forces in the East by Władysław Anders. A monument for Polish soldiers is erected there.

In 1954, the Totskoye range was the site of the Soviet nuclear tests. Totskoye is also the site of the Totskoye air base.

The garrison of the 27th Guards Motor Rifle Division, 2nd Army, Volga–Urals Military District, relocated from the former East Germany in 1990–1993, is located in Totskoye.

References

External links
Red Poppies in Totskoye 
A gallery of the Kresy-Siberia Society

Rural localities in Orenburg Oblast
Buzuluksky Uyezd